The Archdiocese of Singapore (Latin: Archidioecesis Singaporensis) is an exempt archdiocese of the Latin Church of the Catholic Church. Its territory includes all that is under the jurisdiction of the Republic of Singapore.

Its current archbishop is Cardinal William Goh Seng Chye. Goh took over the Archdiocese on 18 May 2013, after Pope Francis accepted the resignation of his predecessor Nicholas Chia Yeck Joo. The Cathedral of the Good Shepherd, located within the Civic District, is the cathedral church of the Archdiocese of Singapore.

As an exempt diocese, the archdiocese is not a part of an ecclesiastical province, but comes under the direct jurisdiction of the Holy See. The archdiocese is a member of the Catholic Bishops' Conference of Malaysia, Singapore and Brunei.

History

The Roman Catholic Church in Singapore was initially under the jurisdiction of the Diocese of Malacca, established by the papal bull pro excellenti praeeminentia issued by Pope Paul IV on 4 February 1558 as one of two new suffragan dioceses (the other being Diocese of Cochin) to the Archdiocese of Goa.

The diocese of Malacca was transferred to the Vicariate Apostolic of Ava and Pegu in 1838 and then the Vicariate Apostolic of Siam in 1840. In 1841, the church was placed under the jurisdiction of the Vicariate Apostolic of Western Siam that was erected from the Vicariate Apostolic of Siam. Initially called the Vicariate Apostolic of Western Siam, the name was changed to the Vicariate Apostolic of the Malay Peninsula and finally the Vicariate Apostolic of Malacca-Singapore.

In 1888, the church was once again placed under the jurisdiction of the Diocese of Malacca when the Diocese was revived. The Diocese of Malacca was raised to the rank of an archdiocese in 1953. In 1955, the Archdiocese of Malacca was split and an ecclesiastical province was formed in its place comprising the Archdiocese of Malacca-Singapore as the metropolitan see and the Diocese of Kuala Lumpur and Diocese of Penang as suffragan dioceses.

In 1972, the Archdiocese of Malacca-Singapore was split into the Diocese of Malacca-Johor and the Archdiocese of Singapore with the Archdiocese of Singapore coming under the direct jurisdiction of the Holy See.

From 1838 to 1981, there was dual jurisdiction situation in Singapore, one tracing authority from the Vicariate Apostolate of Siam down to the present Archdiocese of Singapore and the other with the authority from the Portuguese Mission first from the Archdiocese of Goa and then the Diocese of Macau. This was a legacy of the padroado pronouncement in the 16th century. Dual jurisdiction was ended in 1981, when the Portuguese Mission handed over St Joseph's Church to the Archdiocese of Singapore and, thus, all of Singapore's territories was brought under the Roman Catholic Archdiocese of Singapore.

Ordinaries

Diocese of Malacca
 (1558–1576) Jorge de Santa Luzia
 (1579–1601) João Ribeiro Gaio 
 (1604–1612) Cristovão da Sá e Lisboa 
 (1613–1632) Gonçalvo (Gonzalo) da Silva
 (1637–1638) António do Rosário
Sede vacante (1637–1691)
 (1691–1701) Antonio a Saint Theresia
 (1701–1738) Emmanuel a Santo Antonio 
 (1738–1743) Antonio de Castro
 (1746–1748) Miguel de Bulhões e Souza
 (1748–1760 Geraldo de São José
Sede vacante (1760–1782)
 (1782–1785) Alexandre da Sagrada Familia Ferreira da Silva
Sede vacante (1785–1804)
 (1804–1815) Francisco de São Dâmaso Abreu Vieira
 Sede vacante (1815–1838)
 Sé suprimida (1838–1841)

Vicariate Apostolic of Malacca-Singapore
 (1841–1844) Jean-Paul-Hilaire-Michel Courvezy (Vicar Apostolic of Siam from 1834 to 1841)
 (1845–1871) Jean-Baptiste Boucho	
 (1871–1877) Michel-Esther Le Turdu
 (1878–1888) Edouard Gasnier

Diocese of Malacca
 (1888–1896) Edouard Gasnier
 (1896–1904) René-Michel-Marie Fée
 (1904–1933) Marie-Luc-Alphonse-Emile Barillon
 (1934–1945) Adrien Pierre Devals
 (1947–1953) Michel Olçomendy

Archdiocese of Malacca
 (1953–1955) Michel Olçomendy

Archdiocese of Malacca-Singapore (Metropolitan See)
 (1955–1972) Michel Olçomendy

Archdiocese of Singapore
 (1972–1976) Michel Olçomendy
 (1977–2000) Gregory Yong Sooi Ngean
 (2001–2013) Nicholas Chia Yeck Joo
 (2013–present) Cardinal William Goh Seng Chye

Statistics (2012)
Roman Catholic population: 303,000 (including PRs, Expats and Immigrants)
Churches: 32
Seminary: 1
Diocesan Priests: 71
Religious Priests: 71
Religious Brothers: 36
Religious Sisters: 166
Candidates for the Priesthood: 12
Baptisms: 3521
Catechumens: 895
Marriages: 977
Charitable and Social Institutions: 18
Educational Institutions: 54 Schools, 53,124 Students

Key office holders
Following the appointment of Goh, a new group of key appointment holders were appointed to assist him. There are as follows:

Vicar General (Pastoral), Ambrose Vaz
Vicar General (Administration and Religious), Peter Zhang
Chancellor, Terence Pereira
Episcopal Vicar for the New Evangelisation, Terence Pereira
Financial Administrator, Clement Chen

Churches
The archdiocese is divided into five districts covering the entire city-state of Singapore, namely the City District, East District, West District, North District, and Serangoon District.

Of the thirty-two churches, three churches in the City District are not parishes, namely, the Cathedral of the Good Shepherd, Saint Joseph's Church, and the Church of Saint Alphonsus.

City District
Cathedral of the Good Shepherd – 'A' Queen Street
Saint Joseph's Church (Victoria Street) – 143 Victoria Street
Church of Saints Peter and Paul – 225A Queen Street
Church of Our Lady of Lourdes – 50 Ophir Road
Church of the Sacred Heart- 111 Tank Road
Church of Saint Teresa – 510 Kampong Bahru Road
Church of Saint Alphonsus – 300 Thomson Road
Church of Saint Bernadette – 12 Zion Road
Church of Saint Michael – 17 Saint Michael's Road
East District
Church of the Holy Family – 6 Chapel Road
Church of Our Lady Queen of Peace – 4 Sandy Lane
Church of Saint Stephen – 30 Sallim Road
Church of Our Lady of Perpetual Succour – 31 Siglap Hill
Church of the Holy Trinity – 20 Tampines Street 11
Church of Divine Mercy – 19 Pasir Ris Street 72
West District
Church of Saint Ignatius – 120 King's Road
Blessed Sacrament Church – 1 Commonwealth Drive
Church of St Mary of the Angels – 5 Bukit Batok East Avenue 2
Church of Saint Francis of Assisi – 200 Boon Lay Avenue
Church of the Holy Cross – 450 Clementi Avenue 1
North District
Saint Joseph's Church (Bukit Timah) – 620 Upper Bukit Timah Road
Church of the Risen Christ – 91 Toa Payoh Central
Church of Saint Anthony – 25 Woodlands Avenue 1
Church of the Holy Spirit – 248 Upper Thomson Road
Church of Our Lady Star of the Sea – 10 Yishun Street 22
Church of Christ the King – 2221 Ang Mo Kio Avenue 8
Serangoon District
Church of the Nativity of the Blessed Virgin Mary – 1259 Upper Serangoon Road
Church of the Immaculate Heart of Mary – 24 Highland Road
Church of Saint Francis Xavier – 63A Chartwell Drive
St Anne's Church – 66 Sengkang East Way
Church of Saint Vincent de Paul – 301 Yio Chu Kang Road
Church of the Transfiguration –  51 Punggol Central

Seminary
St Francis Xavier Major Seminary

Controversies

Madonna's Rebel Heart concert
In February 2016, the Church's advice to congregants not to attend Madonna's Rebel Heart concert, the pop singer's first in Singapore, sparked controversy. In a circular, Archbishop Goh warned Christians not to support “the ‘pseudo arts’ that promote sensuality, rebellion, disrespect, pornography, contamination of the mind of the young, abusive freedom, individualism at the expense of the common good, vulgarity, lies and half-truths”.

Expressing concern about Madonna’s "blasphemous music" and her "disrespectful use of Catholic/Christian symbols", the archbishop said he appreciated that “the task of the government in balancing freedom of the arts and public sensitivities is a challenging one”, but warned that “in multi-racial, multi-religious Singapore, we cannot afford to be overly permissive in favour of artistic expression at the expense of respect for one’s religion, especially in these times of heightened religious sensitivities, particularly among active practitioners of religions”. “There is no neutrality in faith; one is either for or against. Being present (at these events) in itself is a counter witness," the archbishop added.

As a debate ensued over whether the Church was imposing its views on the public, other Christian bodies including the National Council of Churches of Singapore, the Anglican church and LoveSingapore, began issuing similar statements. The protests did not end with any change on the part of the Media Development Authority which had already rated the concert R18 for its sexually suggestive content and scrapped a song for "religiously sensitive content".

See also

Catholic education in Singapore
Catholic Church in Singapore
Archdiocese of Malacca-Singapore
CHIJMES

Notes

References
 Johnson Fernandez (2013), Catholic Church Directory 2013 – Archdiocese of Singapore, The Catholic News Office, 
 Eugene Wijeysingha (2006), "Going forth, The Catholic Church in Singapore 1819–2004", The Office of the Archbishop of Singapore,

External links
Official Website of the Archdiocese of Singapore 
Catholic-Hierarchy.org

 
Roman Catholic dioceses in Singapore
Christian organizations established in 1972
Roman Catholic dioceses and prelatures established in the 20th century